The Holy Family Church is the only Catholic church in Gaza City and in the Gaza Strip, State of Palestine. Its priest in charge Gabriel Romanelli, assisted by a vicar also from the same institution. The church also runs two primary and secondary schools, plus some clinics.

The parish receives the support of the Sisters of Charity of Mother Teresa and the Sisters of Charity of the Incarnate Word (also present in Bethlehem, Jaffa and Egypt) and the Rosary Sisters. They take care of the sick, disabled, elderly, regardless of their religion.

As of 2021, the tiny Catholic community in the Gaza Strip consisted of 133 people.

See also
Catholic Church in Palestine
Holy Family Church (disambiguation)

References

Churches in the Gaza Strip
Roman Catholic churches in the State of Palestine
Buildings and structures in Gaza City